Xyris scabrifolia, common name Harper's yelloweyed grass, is a North American species of perennial in the yellow-eyed-grass family. It grows in the southern United States from Texas to North Carolina.

References

scabrifolia
Flora of the United States
Plants described in 1903